Emilio Portes may refer to:

Emilio Portes Gil (1890–1978), Mexican politician
Emilio Portes (director) (born 1976), Mexican film director